Try Out is the debut studio album by French coldwave band KaS Product. It was released in 1982, through record label RCA.

Track listing

Critical reception 

AllMusic called the album "so good it's almost a crime that KaS Product haven't gained more attention".

Personnel 

 Mona Soyoc – vocals, guitar, production
 Spatsz – electronics, production

 Technical

 G. N'Guyen – production
 E. Conod – engineering
 R. Vogel – engineering

References

External links 

 
 Trouser Press guide

1982 debut albums
KaS Product albums